is a Japanese equestrian. He competed in the 2012 Summer Olympics in both the Individual and Team eventing.

References

Japanese male equestrians
1980 births
Living people
Sportspeople from Tokyo
Equestrians at the 2012 Summer Olympics
Olympic equestrians of Japan
Equestrians at the 2010 Asian Games
Equestrians at the 2018 Asian Games
Asian Games gold medalists for Japan
Asian Games medalists in equestrian
Medalists at the 2010 Asian Games
Medalists at the 2018 Asian Games